Mark Adams may refer to:

 Mark Adams (artist) (1925–2006), American artist
 Mark Adams (photographer) (born 1949), New Zealand photographer
 Mark Adams (designer) (born 1961), English car designer
 Mark Adams (musician), funk band Slave bassist
 Mark Adams (basketball, born May 1956), college basketball coach, former head coach of Texas Tech
 Mark Adams (basketball, born June 1956), college basketball analyst and former head coach of Central Connecticut

See also
Marcus Adams (disambiguation)
Adams (surname)